Scarred City is a 1998 action film starring Stephen Baldwin, Tia Carrere and Renée Estevez.

Cast
Stephen Baldwin as John Trace
Tia Carrere as Candy
Renée Estevez as Cop #2
Jeffrey Buehl as Dealer
Michael Rispoli as Sam Bandusky
Chazz Palminteri as Lt. Laine Devon
Gary Dourdan as Sgt. Dan Creedy

Production
The film was party financed by Elie Samaha and starred his then wife Tia Carrere.

Producer John Ashley died during production.

References

External links

Scar City  at BFI

1998 films
1998 action films
Films scored by Anthony Marinelli
Films produced by Elie Samaha
American action films
1990s English-language films
1990s American films